The Penultimate Truth is a 1964 science fiction novel by American writer Philip K. Dick. The story is set in a future where the bulk of humanity is kept in large underground shelters. The people are told that World War III is being fought above them, when in reality the war ended years ago. The novel is based on Dick's 1953 short story "The Defenders". Dick also drew upon two of his other short stories for the plot of the novel: "The Mold of Yancy" and "The Unreconstructed M".

Plot summary

World War III begins late in the 21st century. It is fought between the two superpowers, Wes-Dem and Pac-Peop. The fighting is extensive and severe, most of it performed by "leadies", robots built to withstand the most extreme circumstances. The Earth becomes a battlefield. Unable to exist in the atmosphere created by robot war, vast "ant tanks" are constructed underground to save the diminishing human population.

The government and war engine remains on the surface; the elite "Yance-men". Their president, Talbot Yancy, delivers inspirational speeches to the tankers, motivating them to increase their production of leadies and win the war. The war does eventually end. However, the Yance-men design a conspiracy to maintain the wealth of the Earth for themselves. Yancy continues to describe devastation in televised speeches. The tankers continue to produce leadies.

Talbot Yancy is actually a computer generated simulacrum. The Yance-men program him from the "Agency" in New York. They live in immense villas on private parks, called "demesnes". The leadies are actually used by the Yance-men as personal servants and to maintain their estates. The Agency is run by the most vicious and greedy Yance-man, Stanton Brose, who is kept alive by pre-war artificial organs which he hoards.

The story begins in one of the tanks, named Tom Mix (named after the actor Tom Mix). The tank president, Nicholas St. James, is forced to go to the surface to buy an artificial pancreas on the black market. He emerges on David Lantano's property (a Yance-man). When some of Lantano's leadies try to kill St. James, they are destroyed by a mysterious man who looks like Talbot Yancy. St. James wanders around, through the ruins of a war, and eventually ends up at Lantano's mansion.

Simultaneously, Joseph Adams (another Yance-man) is put on a special mission by Brose. He must plant evidence of alien artifacts on land belonging to a real-estate agent (Louis Runcible) so the land can be legitimately seized. The artifacts are buried using a time travel device. One by one, the people attached to this project are killed. Adams fearfully retreats to Lantano's mansion.

Another person to appear in the mansion is Webster Foote, the owner and operator of a private detective corporation. Foote accepts work on a per-case basis from everybody (including Brose, Lantano and Runcible) but wishes to save Runcible from the plot against him.

Lantano then reveals to Foote, Adams and St. James, that he is a Cherokee from the distant past, somehow being given extended life by the time travel device that placed the artifacts back in time. He has lived through history, taking many positions of note under different names, and now he has killed the members of this special project. Lantano, Foote, and Adams together now plot to kill Brose and free the people underground.

However, Adams figures out Lantano was behind the deaths as part of his plot to bring down Brose. In desperation and fear, he joins up with St. James, who discovered a cache of artificial organs, and flees into the Tom Mix tank with him. They discover that Lantano was ultimately successful but contemplate that the biggest lie is yet to come.

See also 
 "The Defenders"
 "The Mold of Yancy"
 "The Unreconstructed M"

External links
The Penultimate Truth cover art gallery

1964 American novels
1964 science fiction novels
Novels by Philip K. Dick
Dystopian novels
Existentialist novels
American science fiction novels